Standings and results for Group F of the Top 16 phase of the 2007-08 Euroleague basketball tournament.

Standings

 Maccabi win the group on the second tiebreaker of head-to-head point differential against Olympiacos.

Fixtures/results
All times given below are in Central European Time

Game 1
February 14, 2008

Game 2
February 21, 2008

Game 3
February 27–28, 2008

Game 4
March 6, 2008

{{basketballbox|date=March 6|place=Kaunas Sports Hall, Kaunas|time=20:15
|teamA= Žalgiris Kaunas  |scoreA=69
|teamB=  Real Madrid |scoreB=83
|Q1=14-14|Q2=16-30|Q3=23-21|Q4=16-'-18
|report= (Report)
|attendance=5,000
|points1=Popović 18 |points2=Reyes 18
|rebounds1=Jankūnas 9 |rebounds2=Hervelle 8
|assist1=Collins 8 |assist2=Tunçeri 3
}}

Game 5March 13, 2008Game 6March 20, 2008''

References

2007–08 Euroleague